Adriana Samuel Ramos (born April 12, 1966) is a Brazilian volleyball and beach volleyball player, who won the silver medal in the inaugural women's beach volleyball tournament at the 1996 Summer Olympics, partnering Mônica Rodrigues.

Samuel begun her career with indoor volleyball, even becoming a part of Brazil women's national volleyball team. She competed at the 1984 FIVB Volleyball Women's U20 World Championship, the 1985 FIVB Volleyball Women's World Cup, and the 1986 FIVB Volleyball Women's World Championship. However, she left the court in 1992, moving into the beach by forming a partnership with Mônica Rodrigues.

She also represented her native country at the 2000 Summer Olympics in Sydney, Australia, where she claimed the bronze medal, teaming up with Sandra Pires (who had defeated Samuel in Atlanta).

Adriana's brother Alexandre "Tande" Samuel is also a volleyball player, who won the gold medal in the 1992 Summer Olympics in Barcelona.

References

External links
 
 
 
 

1966 births
People from Resende
Brazilian people of English descent
Brazilian women's volleyball players
Brazilian women's beach volleyball players
Olympic beach volleyball players of Brazil
Olympic medalists in beach volleyball
Olympic silver medalists for Brazil
Olympic bronze medalists for Brazil
Beach volleyball players at the 1996 Summer Olympics
Beach volleyball players at the 2000 Summer Olympics
Medalists at the 2000 Summer Olympics
Medalists at the 1996 Summer Olympics
Living people
Competitors at the 1994 Goodwill Games
Goodwill Games medalists in beach volleyball
Sportspeople from Rio de Janeiro (state)